The Ūla is a river which starts in northern Belarus and flows into the Merkys river, southern Lithuania. It flows in a general north-western direction.

It starts as a confluence of two channeled rivers, Provozha (Провожа) and Luchka (Лучка) by the  village. From Luchka to Dubičiai it is known as Pelesa (Padzeyka in Belarus). It flows into Merkys near Paūliai.

See also
Kotra (river), the case of Pelyasa/Pelesa river bifurcation.

References 

Rivers of Grodno Region
Rivers of Lithuania
International rivers of Europe
Rivers of Belarus
Belarus–Lithuania border